Frances Dora Bowes-Lyon, Countess of Strathmore and Kinghorne (née Smith; 29 July 18325 February 1922) was a British noblewoman. She was the paternal grandmother of Queen Elizabeth The Queen Mother, and thus a great-grandmother of Queen Elizabeth II.

Early life 

Her parents were Oswald Smith (1794–1863), of Blendon Hall, Bexley, Kent, banker with Smith, Payne, and Smith, and Henrietta Mildred Hodgson (1805–1891).

Marriage 
On 28 September 1853, she married Claude Bowes-Lyon (21 July 182416 February 1904). He became the 13th holder of the Earldom of Strathmore and Kinghorne following the death of his brother Thomas in 1865. Frances then assumed the title and style of Countess of Strathmore and Kinghorne. Together the couple had 11 children:
 Claude Bowes-Lyon, 14th Earl of Strathmore and Kinghorne (14 March 18557 November 1944), the father of Queen Elizabeth The Queen Mother and grandfather of Queen Elizabeth II. He married Cecilia Cavendish-Bentinck (11 September 186223 June 1938) on 16 July 1881. They had 10 children.
 Francis Bowes-Lyon (23 February 185618 February 1948), married Lady Anne Lindsay (24 December 185815 December 1936) on 23 November 1883. They had 7 children. 
 Ernest Bowes-Lyon (4 August 185827 December 1891), married Isobel Hester Drummond (21 May 186015 July 1945) on 23 August 1882. They had 6 children.
 Herbert Bowes-Lyon (15 August 186014 April 1897), never married. 
 Patrick Bowes-Lyon (5 March 18635 October 1946), a major of the British Army and a tennis player. He married Alice Wiltshire (18671 March 1953) on 9 August 1893. They had 4 children.
 Lady Constance Frances Bowes-Lyon (8 October 186519 November 1951), married Robert Blackburn (27 April 186421 March 1944) on 21 December 1893. They had 4 children.
 Kenneth Bowes-Lyon (26 April 18679 January 1911), never married.
 Lady Mildred Marion Bowes-Lyon (18689 June 1897), a music composer, famous for Etelinda (an opera premiered in Florence in 1894). She married Augustus Jessup (20 June 186116 October 1925) on 1 July 1890. They had 2 children.
 Lady Maud Agnes Bowes-Lyon (12 June 187028 February 1941), never married.
 Lady Evelyn Mary Bowes-Lyon (16 July 187215 March 1876), died in infancy.
 Maj. Malcolm Bowes-Lyon (23 April 187423 August 1957), a lieutenant colonel of the British Army. He married Winifred Gurdon-Rebow (10 October 187630 May 1957) on 28 September 1907. They had a daughter.

Death 
The Earl of Strathmore and Kinghorne died on 16 February 1904, in the Liguria region of Italy. The Countess survived him by almost eighteen years. She died at 19 Hans Place, Chelsea, London on 5 February 1922, aged 89. She was buried at Glamis Castle, Angus, the family seat of the earls of Strathmore and Kinghorne.

Ancestry 
Her paternal grandparents were George Smith, and wife Frances Mary Mosley, daughter of Sir John Parker Mosley, 1st Baronet, and wife Elizabeth Bayley, granddaughter of Nicholas Mosley and wife Elizabeth Parker, and sister of Oswald Mosley, 2nd Baronet, great-great-grandfather of Oswald Mosley.

References 

Strathmore and Kinghorne, Frances Bowes-Lyon, Countess of
Strathmore and Kinghorne, Frances Bowes-Lyon, Countess of
Strathmore and Kinghorne, Frances Bowes-Lyon, Countess of
Frances
Scottish countesses
Frances Dora Smith
British expatriates in Italy